Donald Barcome Jr. (born April 19, 1958 in Green Bay, Wisconsin) is an American curler. He had a successful junior's career, representing the United States at the World Junior Curling Championships three times, winning the championship in 1979. In 1999 he was the vice-skip for Tim Somerville's team when they won the United States Men's Curling Championship, earning the right to represent the United States at the 1999 World Men's Curling Championship, where they finished 4th. In 2002 Barcome was the alternate for the American men's team at the Winter Olympics.

Teams 
2002 Winter Olympics

 Tim Somerville, Skip
 Mike Schneeberger, Third
 Myles Brundidge, Second
 John Gordon, Lead
 Donald Barcome Jr.,Alternate

1999 World Men's Championship

 Tim Somerville, Skip
 Donald Barcome Jr., Third
 Myles Brundidge, Second
 John Gordon, Lead

References

External links 

Living people
Sportspeople from Green Bay, Wisconsin
1958 births
American male curlers
Olympic curlers of the United States
Curlers at the 2002 Winter Olympics
American curling champions